María Luisa Chiappe Pulido is a Colombian economist and businesswoman. She served as Ambassador of Colombia to Venezuela from 2009 to 2010 during the Colombia–Venezuela diplomatic crisis that led to both countries recalling their respective ambassadors and signalled a weakening of diplomatic relations between the two neighbouring nations. Before her appointment as ambassador, Chiappe worked as President of the Colombo-Venezuelan Chamber of Commerce, and had served as Banking Superabundant of Colombia and as Director of the National Administrative Department of Statistics (DANE).

Ambassadorship
On 13 March President Álvaro Uribe Vélez appointed Chiappe as Ambassador of Colombia to the Bolivarian Republic of Venezuela. Chiappes officially presented her Letters of Credence to Vice President of Venezuela Ramón A Carrizales Rengifo on 3 April. In 2010, President Uribe accused the Venezuelan government of permitting the FARC and ELN guerrillas to seek safe haven in its territory, following the Colombia–Venezuela diplomatic crisis; on July 22 the Colombian foreign ministry announced that Ambassador Chiappe, would be recalled "to evaluate the situation", following which they would present evidence at the OAS.

Selected works

References

Year of birth missing (living people)
Living people
Pontifical Xavierian University alumni
University of Los Andes (Colombia) alumni
Colombian economists
Ambassadors of Colombia to Venezuela
Directors of the National Planning Department of Colombia
Colombian women ambassadors